The Olentangy Local School District is a large, rapidly growing school district centered in southern Delaware County, with a small, southern portion (one cul-de-sac) in Franklin County in the U.S. state of Ohio. The Olentangy Local School District comprises  and serves students from all or parts of numerous municipalities, including the unincorporated community of Lewis Center and the cities of Columbus, Delaware, Powell, and Westerville. The district also serves students from Berkshire, Berlin, Concord, Genoa, Liberty, and Orange townships in Delaware and Franklin counties. As of 2020, it operates 15 elementary schools, five middle schools, and four high schools.  Also, there is an online high school called OASIS for selected students at the OASIS headquarters, plus a school for STEM students.

Olentangy is the largest district in Delaware County. In 1998, the district had an enrollment of 4,812. By fall of 2021, it had grown to the 4th largest district in Ohio, behind only Columbus, Cleveland and Cincinnati.

The 7.9 mill bond issue passed on Tuesday, May 3, 2011 and therefore made it possible for all co-curricular and extra-curricular activities to stay in the schools.  Had the levy not passed, serious athletic,
extracurricular, co-curricular, and academic cuts would have been made. This issue was up for renewal on the March 17, 2020 ballot and it passed by a 15-point margin.

The Olentangy district was graded an "A" overall by the Ohio Department of Education in the most recent (2018/19) ODE report card, earning three "A"s, two "B"s, and one "C".

Allegations of racism 
In 2018, Olentangy high school students complained of racism in their high school, and told the school board that their teachers dismissed their concerns and did not punish the use of racial slurs.   Olentangy's superintendent admitted to the Columbus Dispatch that the racist incidents had occurred, and school board president Mindy Patrick reportedly responded by saying that she was "disappointed and saddened" to learn of the racist harassment.

Censorship of Dr. Seuss 
During the taping of a "Planet Money" radio segment for NPR News, Olentangy's assistant director of communications Amanda Beeman interrupted and forbade the reading of the Dr. Seuss book "The Sneetches." She did so in response to students identifying Seuss's themes opposing racism, and saying that she wanted to keep the classroom "discussion that we wanted around economics."  Students protested, saying that they "want to read it" but Beeman forbade them from reading it.  Beeman later admitted that she "wish[ed] she had handled the situation differently."

Schools

Elementary
Alum Creek Elementary School (ACES)
Arrowhead Elementary School (AES)
Cheshire Elementary School (CES)
Freedom Trail Elementary School (FTES)
Glen Oak Elementary School (GOES)
Heritage Elementary School (HES)
Indian Springs Elementary School (ISES)
Johnnycake Corners Elementary School (JCES)
Liberty Tree Elementary School (LTES)
Oak Creek Elementary School (OCES)
Olentangy Meadows Elementary School (OMES)
Scioto Ridge Elementary School (SRES)
Shale Meadows Elementary School (SMES)
Tyler Run Elementary School (TRES)
Walnut Creek Elementary School (WCES)
Wyandot Run Elementary School (WRES)
Grades: K-5

Middle

Olentangy Berkshire Middle School (OBMS)
Olentangy Hyatts Middle School (OHMS)
Olentangy Liberty Middle School (OLMS)
Olentangy Orange Middle School (OOMS)
Olentangy Shanahan Middle School (OSMS)
Grades: 6-8

High
Olentangy Berlin High School
Olentangy Liberty High School
Olentangy Orange High School
Olentangy High School

Grades: 9-12

References

External links
Olentangy Local Schools
olentangysd Twitter feed

Education in Delaware County, Ohio
School districts in Ohio
School districts established in 1952